Hamdan bin Mohammed Al Nahyan (حمدان بن محمد آل نهيان) was an Emirati politician and distant cousin of the founder of UAE, the first President, Zayed bin Sultan Al Nahyan, who was also the emir of Abu Dhabi emirate.

Hamdan bin Mohammed Al Nahyan was born in the 1930s in Al Ain. He was the first chairman of Abu Dhabi’s Public Works Department. He and his brothers, Mubarak, Tahnoun, Saif and Suroor were the major supporters of Zayed bin Sultan, and they all assumed leading posts. From 1977 to 1989 he was in office as the deputy prime minister  (since 1979 sharing this post with the former Prime Minister Maktoum bin Rashid Al Maktoum). 

He died in October, 1989 in a German hospital.

Children
Five children (one son and four daughters) of Sheikh Hamdan married Sheikh Zayed's children. Hamdan's daughter, Sheikha Shamsa bint Hamdan Al Nahyan is married to Sheikh Hamdan bin Zayed bin Sultan Al Nahyan, former deputy prime minister and ruler's representative in the western region of Abu Dhabi or the mayor of the region. Another daughter, Salama bint Hamdan, is the spouse of Hamdan bin Zayed's brother Mohamed bin Zayed Al Nahyan, President of the United Arab Emirates.

References

External links
The UAE Cabinet official site

Emirati politicians
Deputy Prime Ministers of the United Arab Emirates
Government ministers of the United Arab Emirates
Year of birth missing
Year of death missing
House of Al Nahyan